Stars and Their Guitars: A History of the Electric Guitar is a documentary film by filmmaker Kent Hagen. It spotlights the development and history of the classic electric guitar as well as the players that made them famous. Spanning a multitude of genres including rock, blues, rockabilly, country, hard rock, punk and more, this 2008 documentary provides an in-depth look at the six-string's immeasurable impact on society and culture. Les Paul, B.B. King, Duane Eddy, Scotty Moore, Billy Gibbons, Slash, George Thorogood, Joe Satriani, and Elliot Easton are just a few of the guitar legends interviewed. Winner for best documentary at the 2008 Route 66 Film Festival.

External links

Guitars
Documentary films about musical instruments
2008 films
2008 documentary films